Look Inside the Asylum Choir is the 1968 debut album by Asylum Choir, a studio group consisting of the session musicians Leon Russell and Marc Benno. Russell arranged the songs, complete with sped-up trumpet section, and multi-tracked himself playing piano, guitar and drums. Benno contributed multi-tracked vocals, guitar and bass guitar.

Release and reception 

The album was issued by Smash Records in 1968 with catalogue number SRS 67107 (stereo edition). The vinyl's original Smash label designates the name of the album as Look Inside the Asylum Choir by the Asylum Choir, while the album cover titling suggests that it is entitled simply Look Inside. The original gatefold cover featured an image of a roll of toilet paper. The image created sufficient controversy that Smash records reissued the album with a cover featuring a portrait of Russell and Benno.

Look Inside the Asylum Choir received positive reviews from critics in 1968, but sold poorly. Village Voice critic Robert Christgau wrote in 1970 after its re-release that it "more or less" deserved such a reception, deeming it "a nice record to write reviews about: strong studio work with a heavy Zappa flavor, quality of satire ditto".

On May 2, 2011 Rev-Ola Records re-released the album on CD with four bonus tracks. On February 5, 2016 Smash Records re-released the album on CD in the original LP format.

Track listing LP
All songs by Leon Russell and Marc Benno; except where indicated:

 "Welcome to Hollywood" – 2:35
 "Soul Food" (Bill Boatman, James Markham) – 2:05
 "Icicle Star Tree" (Russell, Benno, Wally Wilson) – 2:55
 "Death of the Flowers" (Russell, Benno, Greg Dempsey) – 2:08
 "Indian Style" – 3:30
 "Medley: N.Y. Op./Land of Dog/Henri The Clown" – 6:07
 "Thieves in the Choir" (Russell, Benno, Jerry Riopelle) – 4:04
 "Black Sheep Boogaloo" – 2:29

Track listing CD
All songs by Leon Russell and Marc Benno; except where indicated:
 "Welcome to Hollywood" - 2:45
 "Soul Food" (Leon Russell, Marc Benno, Bill Boatman, James Markham) - 2:10
 "Icicle Star Tree" (Leon Russell, Marc Benno, Wally Wilson) - 3:03
 "Death of the Flowers" (Leon Russell, Marc Benno, Greg Dempsey) - 3:15
 "Indian Style" - 3:46
 Medley: "N.Y. Op./Land of Dog/Henri The Clown" - 6:07
 "Thieves in the Choir" (Leon Russell, Marc Benno, Jerry Riopelle) - 4:04
 "Black Sheep Boogaloo" - 2:29
 "Soul Food" (Leon Russell, Marc Benno, Bill Boatman, James Markham) - 2:19  
 "Welcome to Hollywood" - 3:03 
 "Icicle Star Tree" (Leon Russell, Marc Benno, Wally Wilson) - 3:07 
 "Indian Style" - 3:44
Bonus Tracks 9-12 Mono single versions

Personnel
 Leon Russell - producer, piano, lead vocals
 Marc Benno - producer, guitar, lead vocals
 Joe Foster - re-issue producer, synthesizer
 Andy Morten - re-issue producer, artwork, design, liner notes
 Nick Robbins - synthesizer
 Lou Kimzey  - design 
 Gordon Rudd - engineer 
 Ralph Poole - photography

In usage
The sixth track "Medley: N.Y. Op./Land of Dog/Henri The Clown" was sampled in singer Usher's song "Get In My Car" featuring rapper Bun B which appears in the EP Versus and the deluxe edition of his album Raymond v. Raymond.

References

External links
Official Leon Russell website
Official Marc Benno website
Leon Russell discography
Leon Russell lyrics
Leon Russell Records
Leon Russell NAMM Oral History Program Interview (2012)

1968 debut albums
Smash Records albums
Rev-Ola Records albums
The Asylum Choir albums
Albums produced by Leon Russell
Albums produced by Marc Benno